The East Region was a region that competed in the Little League World Series between 1957 and 2000, until it was split into the Mid-Atlantic and New England regions in 2001.  

The East Region was inaugurated in 1957 when the LLWS first gave out Series berths to Regional winners.  The Region initially consisted of teams from Connecticut, Maine, Massachusetts, New Hampshire, New Jersey, New York, Pennsylvania, Rhode Island, Vermont, and two Canadian provinces (Ontario and Quebec). A year later, in 1958, the Canada Region was created and given its own automatic berth In the LLWS. Puerto Rico briefly competed in the East Region, from 1963 through 1967, before moving to the Latin American region.  Delaware and Maryland moved to the East Region in 1968; Washington D.C., was given its own spot in the region in 1998.

Little League Baseball expanded the LLWS to sixteen teams for the 2001 Little League World Series.  The East Region was split into the Mid-Atlantic Region (Delaware, Maryland, New Jersey, New York, Pennsylvania, and Washington D.C.) and the New England Region (Connecticut, Maine, Massachusetts, New Hampshire, Rhode Island, and Vermont).

Champions 1957-2000 in the East Region

The following table indicates the East Region champion and its LLWS performance in each year between 1957 and 2000.

Results by State

See also
Mid-Atlantic Region (Little League World Series)
New England Region (Little League World Series)

References

External links
 Little League Online
 East Region Historical Results

East
Defunct baseball competitions in the United States
Sports in the Eastern United States